WSC, Wholesale Supply Co. Ltd. was a Scottish automobile manufacturer, established in 1914 in Aberdeen. The cyclecar was marketed under the name of WSC with a V twin J.A.P. engine rated for taxation at 8 hp.

See also
 List of car manufacturers of the United Kingdom

References

Sources
 Harald Linz and Halwart Schrader: The International Motor encyclopedia. : United Soft Media Verlag GmbH, Munich 2008, 
 Nick Georgano: . The Beaulieu Encyclopedia of the Automobile, Volume 3 P-Z Fitzroy Dearborn Publishers, Chicago 2001,  (English)
 David Culshaw & Peter Horrobin: The Complete Catalogue of British Cars 1895-1975 . Veloce Publishing plc. Dorchester (1997). 

Defunct motor vehicle manufacturers of Scotland
Cyclecars
1914 establishments in Scotland
Companies based in Aberdeen